is the second season and the 22nd entry in Tsuburaya Productions' long-running Ultra Series. Like its predecessor Ultra Galaxy Mega Monster Battle, NEO is a pay-per-view service. The first episode was distributed for free online on December 12, 2008, and remained available until January 31, 2009. The show was broadcast on BS11 beginning December 20, 2008. Mega Monster Battle Gymnastics also had a touring stage show with dancing and exercises set to music and starring Shota Minami, with cameo appearances by Hiroyuki Konishi and Saki Kamiryo.

On July 25, 2017, Toku announced that the series (along with its first season) would air in the United States on its channel with English subtitles beginning September 19, 2017.

Plot

One month after the events of the last series, ZAP Spacy finds itself under attack by the Reionics Hunters, members of the Alien Pedan, and the creators of the original King Joe Black, that seek to exterminate all Reionics in the universe. The story takes place on Planet Hammer where ZAP Spacy finds itself battling the Reionics, Reionics Hunters, and the originator of the Reionics, Reiblood.

Episodes

Cast
 - 
 - 
 - 
 - 
 - 
 - 
 - 
 - 
 -

Suit actors
Gomora - , 
Reimon - 

Songs
Opening theme

Ending theme

Lyrics: Keizo Nakanishi, 
Composition: Keizo Nakanishi
Arrangement: 
Artist:

References

External links
Official Ultra Galaxy Mega Monster Battle site 
Official Giant Monster Battle: ULTRA MONSTERS site 
Ultra Galaxy Mega Monster Battle: Never Ending Odyssey at TV Tokyo 

2008 Japanese television series debuts
2009 Japanese television series endings
Mega Monster Battle